The Fundamental Library of Uzbekistan Academy of Sciences is one of the key parts of "Academy of Sciences of Uzbekistan" and plays significant role in development of sciences in the Republic of Uzbekistan.

About 
Fundamental Library of Uzbekistan Academy of Sciences supports the researches and scientific workers of Academy of Sciences of Uzbekistan with information recourses and is the coordinator of information among the members of Academy of Sciences of Uzbekistan. The "Fundamental Library of Uzbekistan Academy of Sciences" supplies the visitors with the Internet access and it consists of 5 departments, which are given as follows:
Fund of the library
Serving department
Scientific methodic and biographic recourses department
International department
Information technologies department

The fund of the “Fundamental Library of Uzbekistan Academy of Sciences” consists of more than 5 million different books, and the library is nowadays used by more than 45 thousand subscribers.

History of development 
1933 – “Fundamental Library of Uzbekistan Academy of Sciences” was founded
1994 – first electron catalog of books was created at the “Fundamental Library of Uzbekistan Academy of Sciences”
1998 –technological operations are held at the “Fundamental Library of Uzbekistan Academy of Sciences”
2001 – the first innovational project was held at the “Fundamental Library of Uzbekistan Academy of Sciences” among the libraries of Central Asia, about 150 library workers raised their qualifications at the library
2002 – new academic project held at the “Fundamental Library of Uzbekistan Academy of Sciences”
2007 – information recourse center was established at the “Fundamental Library of Uzbekistan Academy of Sciences”, which gave the opportunity of usage of the software tools like “YEVSSO” and “PMT8”.

International affairs 
“Fundamental Library of Uzbekistan Academy of Sciences” currently cooperates with many international and local libraries, as well as many Academy of Sciences of different countries.

Location 
“Fundamental Library of Uzbekistan Academy of Sciences” is located in Tashkent city, Uzbekistan, I.Muminova street, house 13.

Director 
Currently, the director of the "Fundamental Library of Uzbekistan Academy of Sciences" is Berdieva Zukhra Shukurovna.

See also 

National Library of Uzbekistan
Academy of Sciences of Uzbekistan

References

External links 
Official website 
Page on UzScienceNet  
Catalog of libraries in Uzbekistan
Information about the library

Buildings and structures in Tashkent
Education in Uzbekistan
Educational organisations based in Uzbekistan
Education in Tashkent
Libraries in Uzbekistan